Nicholas Sinclair is a photographer.

Nicholas or Nick Sinclair may also refer to:

Nicholas Sinclair (swimmer), represented Canada at the 2010 Pan Pacific Swimming Championships
Nicholas Sinclair, character in A.P.E.X.
Nick Sinclair, photographer
Nick Sinclair (footballer)